Pettson och Findus – Kattonauten is a Swedish children's film from 2000, based on the books Pettson and Findus by Sven Nordqvist.

Plot
The cat Findus decides he wants to write a letter to the King, in an attempt to convince Pettson that kittens don't have to clean up. While Findus waits for a response, he and the old man are visited by tigers, mooses and an occasional forgotten relative.

External links

Swedish children's films
Swedish animated films
Films based on Swedish novels
2000 animated films
2000 films
Animated films about cats
2000s Swedish-language films
2000s Swedish films